Maniwaki is a town in the province of Quebec, Canada. The town is the administrative centre for La Vallée-de-la-Gatineau Regional County Municipality.

History 
The history of Maniwaki is closely linked to that of the adjacent Kitigan Zibi Reserve, because the Town of Maniwaki was developed on land that was originally part of this reserve. Its municipal lands were included in historical land claims by Kitigan Zibi; some of which were settled as recently as 2007.

In the first half of the nineteenth century, Algonquins of the mission at Lake of Two Mountains, under the leadership of Chief Pakinawatik, came to the area of the Désert River. Shortly after, in 1832, the Hudson's Bay Company followed them and installed a trading post at the confluence of the Désert and Gatineau rivers. A decade later, Missionary Oblates of Mary Immaculate established the mission of Notre-Dame-du-Desert and, from 1849, they demanded of the authorities the demarcation of a township in order to establish a reserve for the Algonquins. The township limits were drawn in 1850 and the settlement was given the name of Maniwaki by the Oblates at this time (Algonquin for "Mary's Land"). Soon after, wood merchants, farmers, trade workers, businessmen and professionals, drawn by the forest's wealth, came to live in Maniwaki.

Ottawa was linked to Maniwaki by a branch line of the Canadian Pacific Railroad, a distance of 82.3 miles. After crossing the Ottawa River, there were stations were at Hull, Wakefield, Low, Kazabazua and Gracefield before reaching Maniwaki. It was opened in stages between 1893 and 1902. Passenger services were discontinued in 1964. The line was totally abandoned in 1986.

In 1851, the Oblats founded the L'Assomption-de-Maniwaki parish. Forestry took root and became the livelihood of many settlers in the region. Irish, French and Algonquins, the three traditional cultures of the Gatineau Valley, contributed to the development of the town and lived side by side in harmony. Maniwaki was officially founded in 1851 and became a township municipality in 1904. It obtained the status of "village" in 1930, and status of "Ville" in 1957.

At the end of World War I, the region, like everywhere in Quebec, indeed like in most of the world, was hit by an epidemic of the Spanish influenza. In less than two weeks, some twenty deaths were related to this sickness. Scared, people refused to go outdoors, and for the first time in its history, a Sunday passed without any mass being celebrated at the Assumption church.

The flood of 1974 is an event remembered by the local population. On May 14 of that year, the waters of the Gatineau river and those of the Désert river overflowed. The water rose at the alarming rate of 3 to 6 inches an hour. Over 1,000 residences in the Maniwaki area were flooded and approximately 3,000 peoples had to be evacuated. Although no one was injured, damages reached many millions of dollars.

Since 1974, no other major calamity has occurred. The area continues prospering every year in two predominant fields, namely forestry and tourism.

Demographics 

Languages (2006):
 English as first language: 5.5%
 French as first language: 90.7%
 English and French as first language: 0.7%
 Other as first language: 3.1%

Notable people 
 Annie Galipeau - actress who starred in the 1999 movie about Grey Owl, alongside Pierce Brosnan
 Matt Lang - country music artist
 Gino Odjick - NHL player for Vancouver Canucks, New York Islanders, Philadelphia Flyers and Montreal Canadiens

Disappearance of Maisy Odjick and Shannon Alexander 

On September 6, 2008, the town of Maniwaki was brought into the international spotlight with the disappearance of Maisy Odjick and Shannon Alexander from the Kitigan Zibi Nation. Search and Rescue Global One was invited to the community by the chief and council. Two separate searches were conducted, both unsuccessful. Since their disappearance, the Quebec police, RCMP and the Kitigan Zibi Anishinabeg police have carried out several investigations, but it was not possible to move the case forward.

References

External links 

 Official website

Cities and towns in Quebec
Incorporated places in Outaouais